{{DISPLAYTITLE:1QIsab}}

1QIsab is a fragmentary copy of the Book of Isaiah found at Qumran Cave 1 by Bedouin from the Ta'amireh tribe in 1947. It was discovered along with and grouped and sold together with two other Dead Sea Scrolls, the Thanksgiving Hymn and the War Scroll.

History
Eleazar Sukenik purchased the scroll from an antiquities dealer in Bethlehem named Faidi Salahi, who had purchased the scroll from the Bedouin, on December 21, 1947. Much of the scroll is dark and blackened, preserved in multiple fragments, and in four major sheets that contain the upper section of the last third of the book. Paleography dates the scroll to the late Hasmonaean or early Herodian period in the first century BCE.

References

Book of Isaiah
1946 archaeological discoveries
Dead Sea Scrolls
1st-century BC biblical manuscripts